Fruitcake (or fruit cake or fruit bread) is a cake made with candied or dried fruit, nuts, and spices, and optionally soaked in spirits. In the United Kingdom, certain rich versions may be iced and decorated.

Fruitcakes are usually served in celebration of weddings and Christmas. Given their rich nature, fruitcakes are most often consumed on their own, as opposed to with condiments (such as butter or cream).

History

The earliest recipe from ancient Rome lists pomegranate seeds, pine nuts, and raisins that were mixed into barley mash. In the Middle Ages, honey, spices, and preserved fruits were added.

Fruitcakes soon proliferated all over Europe. Recipes varied greatly in different countries throughout the ages, depending on the available ingredients as well as (in some instances) church regulations forbidding the use of butter, regarding the observance of Fasting. Pope Innocent VIII (1432–1492) finally granted the use of butter, in a written permission known as the ‘Butter Letter' or Butterbrief in 1490, giving permission to Saxony to use milk and butter in the Stollen fruitcakes.

Starting in the 16th century, sugar from the American Colonies (and the discovery that high concentrations of sugar could preserve fruits) created an excess of candied fruit, thus making fruitcakes more affordable and popular. 

The 17th century English fruitcake was originally yeast-leavened, and the rum and dried fruit helped extend the shelf life of the cake.

In various countries

Australia 
In Australia, fruitcake is consumed throughout the year, but most commonly at Christmas, and is available at most major retail outlets. The cake is rarely given icing; often it is consumed with butter or margarine, or custard.

Bahamas 
In the Bahamas, not only is the fruitcake drenched with rum, but the ingredients are as well. All of the candied fruits, walnuts, and raisins are placed in an enclosed container and are soaked with the darkest variety of rum, anywhere from 2 weeks to 3 months in advance. The cake ingredients are mixed, and once the cake has finished baking, rum is poured onto it while it is still hot.

Bulgaria 

In Bulgaria, the common fruitcake is known as keks, is home-made and is consumed throughout the year. Recipes for keks vary, but commonly it contains flour, butter and/or cooking oil, milk, yeast, yoghurt, eggs, cocoa, walnuts, and raisins. It is usually baked in Bundt-style pans.

There is also another specific type of fruitcake prepared for Easter, which is known as kozunak.

Canada 
The fruitcake is commonly eaten during the Christmas season in Canada. Rarely is it seen during other times of the year. The Canadian fruitcake is similar in style to the UK version. However, there is rarely icing on the cake, and alcohol is not commonly put into Christmas cakes that are sold. The cakes are shaped like a small loaf of bread, and often covered in marzipan.

Dark, moist and rich Christmas fruitcakes are the most frequently consumed, with white Christmas fruitcake less common. These cakes tend to be made in mid-November to early December when the weather starts to cool down. They are a staple during Christmas dinner and also can be a gift generally exchanged between business associates and close friends/family.

Chile 
Pan de Pascua is a fruitcake traditionally eaten around Christmas and Epiphany.

France 
In France, fruitcake is called gâteau aux fruits.

Germany 

In Germany, baked goods which fit the description of fruitcake are not usually regarded as cake but rather as sweet breads.

Stollen is loaf-shaped and often powdered with icing sugar on the outside. It is usually made with yeast, butter, water, and flour, with the addition of citrus zest, candied citrus peel, raisins, and almonds.

The most famous Stollen is the Dresdner Stollen, sold at the Dresden Christmas market, the Striezelmarkt.
Official Dresden Stollen, produced by only 150 Dresden bakers, bears a special seal depicting Elector Augustus II the Strong.

In Bremen, the local fruitcake called Klaben is traditionally sold and eaten during the Christmas season. Bremer Klaben is a kind of stollen which is not dusted with powdered sugar after baking. Both Dresdner Stollen and Bremen Klaben are protected geographical indications.

In Southern Germany and the Alpine region, Früchtebrot (also called Berewecke, Birnenbrot, Hutzenbrot, Hutzelbrot, Kletzenbrot, Schnitzbrot, or Zelten) is a sweet, dark bread baked with nuts and dried fruit, e.g. apricots, figs, dates, plums, etc.

India 
Fruitcake is a rich dense cake packed with dry fruits and nuts flavoured with spices usually made during Christmas. In India, this is found everywhere during the Christmas season, although it is also available commonly throughout the year.

Ireland 

In Ireland, a type of sweetbread called barmbrack is eaten at Hallowe'en. The cake contains different objects such as a ring or small coin, each signifying a different fortune for the person who finds it.

Italy 

Panforte is a chewy, dense Tuscan fruitcake dating back to 13th-century Siena. Panforte is strongly flavored with spices (panforte means "strong bread") and baked in a shallow form. Genoa's fruitcake, a lower, denser but still crumbly variety, is called pandolce ("sweet bread").

There are various types of fruitcakes from the Emilia-Romagna region, most being dark and heavily spiced with an abundance of candied fruit and nuts. The certosino from Bologna is a round cake similar to pan forte but with Chinese spices and a variety of whole-halved candied fruit decorating the top; dark chocolate is often added to the dough for a richer flavour. The certosino is low and very dense. Panone, produced in much of Emilia, is similar to the certosino, but with a lighter, fluffier dough and candied fruit inside the cake rather than used as decoration. Panpepato from Ferrara has a dough similar to panone but has a higher ginger content, giving it almost a gingerbread taste. Candied fruit is not often found and instead there is a high concentration of nuts within the dough; the entire cake is often coated in dark chocolate. 

Gubana is a Christmas/holiday cake from the Friuli-Venezia Giulia region, specifically from the area around Cividale del Friuli. It is a leavened dough cake with a filling of nuts, dried fruit, sugar, and grappa which is rolled into a spiral filled tube which is then twisted into the shape of a rose or snail's shell. Gubana is often eaten with alcohol (slivovitz or grappa) around the holiday season. It combines Italian, Friulan, and Slovenian tastes and cooking styles to make a unique sweet. 

Panettone is a Milanese sweet bread loaf (widely available throughout Italy and in many other countries), served around Christmas, which is traditionally filled with dried and candied fruits, with a bread loaf consistency.

New Zealand 
Fruitcakes arrived in New Zealand with early settlers from Britain. Until the 1960s fruitcake was generally homemade, but since then has become commercially widely available in a range of styles. Light coloured fruitcake is often sold as tennis cake or light fruit-cake all year round.

Most New Zealand wedding cakes are finely iced and decorated fruitcake often several tiers high. Most fruitcake is eaten in the Christmas period. It is dark, rich and made from multiple dried fruits. Homemade cakes may use brandy or sherry to enhance flavour rather than as a preservative. They may be square or round, iced or uniced. A Christmas cake is usually simply decorated with a Christmas scene or the words Merry Christmas.

Poland 

Keks is a traditional fruitcake eaten during Christmas season. It is a loaf shaped sponge cake with a substantial content of nuts, raisins, figs and candied fruits.

Portugal 
Although French in its origin, Bolo Rei is a traditional fruitcake enjoyed during Christmas season and a staple dessert in any Portuguese home during the holidays. Included is the characteristic fava bean and, according to tradition, whoever finds the fava bean has to pay for the cake the following year.

Switzerland 
Birnenbrot is a dense sweet Swiss fruitcake with candied fruits and nuts.

Anglophone Caribbean 
Black cake, is a traditional part of Christmas celebration in the English Caribbean. The cake incorporates a large quantity of mixed fruits and rum/wine and becomes a treasured Christmas treat consumed and given out between the Christmas season and New Year. The fruit, wine and rum is prepared weeks, sometimes months, ahead, and has its origin in the English Christmas pudding, and can be quite expensive. It is very different from a North American fruitcake.

United Kingdom 

In the UK, fruitcakes are made in types ranging from extremely light to rich and moist.

The traditional Christmas cake is a round fruitcake covered in marzipan and then in white royal icing or fondant icing. It is often further decorated with snow scenes, holly leaves, and berries (real or artificial), or tiny decorative robins or snowmen. It is also the tradition for a similar kind of cake to be served at weddings.

In Yorkshire, fruitcake is often served accompanied with cheese. Fruitcakes in the United Kingdom often contain currants and glace cherries, an example of this type being the Genoa cake. A type of fruitcake which originated in Scotland, the Dundee Cake, owes its name to Keiller's marmalade. It does not contain glace cherries, but is decorated with almonds.

Fruitcake was historically referred to as plum cake in England from around 1700.

United States 

Typical American fruitcakes are rich in fruit and nuts.

Mail-order fruitcakes in America began in 1913. Some well-known American bakers of fruitcake include Collin Street Bakery in Corsicana, Texas, and The Claxton Bakery in Claxton, Georgia. Both Collin Street and Claxton are Southern companies with inexpensive access to large quantities of nuts, for which the expression "nutty as a fruitcake" was derived in 1935. Commercial fruitcakes are often sold from catalogues by charities as a fund raiser.

Most American mass-produced fruitcakes are alcohol-free, but those made according to traditional recipes are saturated with liqueurs or brandy and covered in powdered sugar, both of which prevent mould. Brandy (or wine) soaked linens can be used to store the fruitcakes, and some people feel that fruitcakes improve with age.

In the United States, the fruitcake has become a ridiculed dessert, in part due to the mass-produced inexpensive cakes of questionable age. Some attribute the beginning of this trend with The Tonight Show host Johnny Carson. He would joke that there really is only one fruitcake in the world, passed from family to family. After Carson's death, the tradition continued with "The Fruitcake Lady" (Marie Rudisill), who made appearances on the show and offered her "fruitcake" opinions.  In fact, the fruitcake had been a butt of jokes on television programs such as Father Knows Best and The Donna Reed Show years before The Tonight Show debuted and appears to have first become a vilified confection in the early 20th century, as evidenced by Warner Brothers cartoons.

Since 1995, Manitou Springs, Colorado, has hosted the Great Fruitcake Toss on the first Saturday of every January. "We encourage the use of recycled fruitcakes," says Leslie Lewis of the Manitou Springs Chamber of Commerce. The all-time Great Fruitcake Toss record is 1,420 feet, set in January 2007 by a group of eight Boeing engineers who built the "Omega 380," a mock artillery piece fueled by compressed air pumped by an exercise bike.

Shelf life 
When a fruitcake contains a good deal of alcohol, it can be preserved for many years. For example, a fruitcake baked in 1878 has been kept as an heirloom by a family in Tecumseh, Michigan; as of 2019, the baker's great-great-granddaughter is the custodian of the cake. Wrapping the cake in alcohol-soaked linen before storing is one method of lengthening its shelf life.

A 106-year-old fruitcake discovered in 2017 by the Antarctic Heritage Trust was described as in "excellent condition" and "almost" edible.

See also 

 List of cakes
 List of fruit dishes
 Bara brith
 Christmas cake
 Christmas pudding
 Clementine cake
 Crema de fruta
 Fig cake
 Kulich
 Panettone
Plum cake
 Stollen

References

Citations

Works Cited
 

Christmas cakes
Foods with alcoholic drinks
Fruit dishes
Wedding food
Yeast cakes